Paul Fosu-Mensah (born 10 April 2001) is a Dutch professional footballer who plays as a defender for Liga II club Politehnica Iași.

Club career
Fosu-Mensah is a former youth academy player of Zeeburgia, Ajax and Vitesse. On 28 July 2021, he joined Eerste Divisie club Helmond Sport on a one-year deal. He made his professional debut on 20 August 2021 in a 3–2 league defeat against MVV Maastricht.

On 20 July 2022, Fosu-Mensah signed a one-year contract with Romanian Liga II club Politehnica Iași.

International career
Fosu-Mensah is a former Dutch youth national team player. He has played for under-15 team in a friendly against Germany.

Personal life
Born in Netherlands, Fosu-Mensah is of Ghanaian descent. He is the younger brother of fellow footballers Alfons and Timothy.

Career statistics

Club

References

External links
 

2001 births
Living people
Footballers from Amsterdam
Association football defenders
Dutch footballers
Dutch expatriate footballers
Netherlands youth international footballers
Dutch sportspeople of Ghanaian descent
Eerste Divisie players
Liga II players
Helmond Sport players
FC Politehnica Iași (2010) players
Expatriate footballers in Romania
Dutch expatriate sportspeople in Romania